John Charles Martin was an American newspaper publisher. Beginning in 1913, ran the newspapers purchased by his step father-in-law Cyrus Curtis, including the Public Ledger, the New York Evening Post,  the Philadelphia Inquirer and four others. In 1931, an insurance industry magazine published a listing of Americans carrying the most life insurance; Martin was second on the list with $6,540,000 in insurance, after Pierre Samuel du Pont with $7 million. 

Martin's former estate in Wyncote, Pennsylvania now houses the Reconstructionist Rabbinical College.

References

American publishers (people)
Businesspeople from Philadelphia
People from Cheltenham, Pennsylvania